Ficus subcordata is a banyan fig species in the family Moraceae.  No subspecies are listed in the Catalogue of Life.  The species can be found in Indo-china, Malesia and New Guinea.  In Vietnam it may be called sung mù u.

References

External links 
 
 

subcordata
Trees of Vietnam
Flora of Indo-China
Flora of Malesia